Nikola "Kole" Ristanovski (born 23 January 1969) is a Macedonian actor. He has appeared in more than twenty films since 1993.

Filmography

Film

References

External links 

1969 births
Living people
Macedonian male film actors
Macedonian male stage actors
Actors from Ostrava
Czech people of Macedonian descent